The 2018–19 Rutgers Scarlet Knights men's basketball team represented Rutgers University–New Brunswick during the 2018–19 NCAA Division I men's basketball season. The Scarlet Knights, led by third-year head coach Steve Pikiell, played their home games at the Louis Brown Athletic Center in Piscataway, New Jersey as fifth-year members of the Big Ten Conference. The Knights finished the season 14–17, 7–13 in Big Ten play to finish in a three-way tie for 10th place. In the Big Ten tournament, they lost in the first round to Nebraska.

Previous season
The Knights finished the 2017–18 season 15–19, 3–15 in Big Ten play to finish in last place. In the Big Ten tournament, they defeated Minnesota and Indiana before losing to Purdue in the semifinals.

Offseason

Departures

Incoming transfers

2018 recruiting class

Roster

Schedule and results

|-
!colspan=9 style=|Regular season

|-
!colspan=9 style=|Big Ten tournament

Source

References

Rutgers Scarlet Knights men's basketball seasons
Rutgers
Rutgers
Rutgers